Deinandra corymbosa is a rare North American species of plants in the tribe Madieae within the family Asteraceae. A common name is coastal tarweed.

Deinandra corymbosa is native to California, found in the Coast Ranges from Humboldt County to Santa Barbara County. Isolated populations have been reported farther inland in Shasta and Kern Counties, the latter in an urban area within the City of Mariposa.

Deinandra corymbosa is an annual herb up to 100 cm (40 inches) tall. It produces many yellow flower heads, each with both disc florets and ray florets.

References

corymbosa
Endemic flora of California
Plants described in 1836
Flora without expected TNC conservation status